Bdintsi is a village in the municipality of Dobrichka in Dobrich Province, which is located in northeastern Bulgaria.

References

Villages in Dobrich Province